Shahrak-e Enqelab (also Romanized as Shahrak-e Enqelāb) is a village in Hesar-e Amir Rural District, in the Central District of Pakdasht County, Tehran Province, Iran. At the 2006 census, its population was 10,344, in 2,456 families.

References 

Populated places in Pakdasht County